The 1994 Delaware Fightin' Blue Hens football team represented the University of Delaware as a member of the Mid-Atlantic Division of the Yankee Conference during the 1994 NCAA Division I-AA football season. Led by 29th-year head coach Tubby Raymond, the Fightin' Blue Hens compiled an overall record of 7–3–1 with a mark of 5–3 in conference play, placing third in the Yankee Conference's Mid-Atlantic Division. The team played home games at Delaware Stadium in Newark, Delaware.

Schedule

Roster

References

Delaware
Delaware Fightin' Blue Hens football seasons
Delaware